Thomas Leonard Blomqvist (born 30 November 1993) is a New Zealand-based, Britain-born Swedish professional racing driver. He competes in the IMSA SportsCar Championship with Meyer Shank Racing. Blomqvist also competes in the FIA World Endurance Championship with United Autosports in the LMP2 category. Blomqvist won the 2022 and 2023 24 Hours of Daytona with Meyer Shank and the 2018 24 Hours of Spa with BMW Motorsport. He is the son of 1984 Swedish World Rally Champion, Stig Blomqvist, and raced under a Swedish racing licence until March 2010.

He resides in Monaco having grown up in Auckland, New Zealand, and Saffron Walden, United Kingdom.

Career

Junior career 
Blomqvist began his racing career in karting, in which he competed between 2003 and 2008, winning eight Championship titles in New Zealand. In 2009, at the young age of 15, he left his home in New Zealand in order to make the move to motor racing in Europe, starting with Formula Renault 2.0 Sweden where he took five podium finishes and one victory from 14 races, finishing third in the standings. He also finished third in the Formula Renault NEZ Championship. At the end of the season, having to first apply for special permission to race as he was still only 15 years old, he competed in two of the four races of the Formula Renault UK Winter Series winning both of the races at the Rockingham Motor Speedway.

In 2010 he competed in the full Formula Renault UK season racing for Fortec Motorsport, taking 12 podiums on his way to becoming the youngest ever champion in the series' history at the age of 16, beating the record set by Lewis Hamilton who won the Championship aged 18.

November 2010 saw Blomqvist compete in the iconic Macau Grand Prix. Driving for Eurointernational he secured 3rd place with fastest lap time in the Formula BMW Pacific race.

In December 2010 Blomqvist was a McLaren Autosport BRDC Award finalist as well as receiving the British Club Driver of the Year award. At the British Racing Drivers' Club awards he received the Henry Surtees award for the most outstanding performance by a rising star.

On 30 November 2011 Blomqvist signed with MB Partners Ltd, owned by former F1 driver Mark Blundell. Blomqvist was again a McLaren Autosport BRDC Award finalist at the end of 2011.

In February 2012 Blomqvist joined the select group of young talent on the McLaren Driver Development Programme.

In the same month, Blomqvist was one of six finalists in a large selection process as Porsche looked for two new junior drivers who would also be contesting the Porsche Carrera Cup. Despite the accolade of being chosen as one of the drivers, Blomqvist elected to stay in single-seaters and a few weeks later, having been selected as a European F3 VW Factory Driver, he signed with ma-con motorsport to contest the F3 Euroseries.

Formula 3 

Because of his outstanding success at Macau in 2010, 2011 saw Blomqvist competing in German F3 with Performance Racing. Despite competing against stronger teams, he was 3rd in the Championship, when at the start of the race at  EuroSpeedway Lausitz he was hit by another car and propelled into a wall, prematurely ending his season and breaking his back at the same time. It would require several months of recuperation before Blomqvist was fit to drive again.

Nonetheless, Eurointernational invited Blomqvist to compete in the 2012 German F3 Championship, fitting the races around his F3 Euroseries schedule. Despite competing in only five rounds due to his prior injury, Blomqvist was 5th in the Championship having achieved an impressive 10 podiums, including five wins, and led by 16 points for these rounds.

Blomqvist finished the season in 7th place for both the F3 Euroseries and the FIA European Formula 3 Championship, having competed with a team new to Formula 3. He entered the Macau F3 street circuit race in November 2012 where he and his team, Eurointernational, used a brand new car, but with no time to test beforehand, the results were disappointing.

At the end of 2012 Blomqvist was selected to join the Red Bull Junior Team and competed in the newly formed FIA European Formula 3 Championship this year — billed as "the most competitive young talent series on the planet" - where he joined his former team EuroInternational as their lone driver for the 2013 season. Despite the team being new to Formula 3, Blomqvist finished the season in 7th place and EuroInternational finished 5th in the Team Championship. Quite an achievement considering all their points were harvested by just one driver, Blomqvist, whereas the teams that finished ahead each had several drivers.

In November 2013 Blomqvist entered the Macau Grand Prix, this time driving for his former team, Fortec Motorsport. The Red Bull Junior driver was back on pace and looking at starting on pole. However, in the dying minutes of the session Blomqvist was unable to get another clear lap, losing pole position and ending up sixth. During the qualifying race, the unfamiliar starting procedure of the Fortec car caused him to stall at the start. While waiting to be restarted, a distracted Harry Tincknell, who had also momentarily stalled, drove straight into the back of him, ending Blomqvist's day and causing him to start at the back of the grid for the final race. Blomqvist then went on to have a great race the following day. He charged his way through the 28-car field, and when the checkered flag was shown 15 laps later, Blomqvist came home in eighth place.

For 2014 Blomqvist again competed in the European Formula 3 Championship driving for Carlin, along with his teammates, Antonio Giovinazzi and Sean Gelael, driving under a new banner of Jagonya Ayam with Carlin in their Dallara-Volkswagens.
After a thrilling season racing with the cream of junior motorsport's talent, Blomqvist managed to finish 2nd in the championship, despite incurring engine change penalties.

In November 2014 Blomqvist entered the Macau Grand Prix driving his Jagonya Ayam with Carlin car. Despite being one of the quickest drivers on the track in practice and qualifying, Blomqvist's luck ran out within the first lap of the Grand Prix. After making a great start from 3rd, Blomqvist was challenging for the lead which he took after Lucas Auer made a mistake a few corners in. As Blomqvist took the corner, Esteban Ocon made an over optimistic move from behind, and the two collided. Although Ocon had damaged his suspension at San Francisco Bend, he managed to go on, but a powerless Blomqvist was driven into the barriers, ending his race.  Due to the narrow track there was a multiple car pile-up behind, with Yu Kanamaru getting launched first over Jordan King and then Blomqvist, before landing on a wall at the side of the track. No one was hurt in the chaos, and after the race was restarted Felix Rosenqvist went on to become the 2014 winner.

DTM

2015 
On 2 February 2015 it was announced Blomqvist had secured a BMW DTM drive for multiple seasons, replacing the spot left vacant by the departure of Joey Hand. The announcement followed a selection test carried out by Blomqvist, Jack Harvey, Robin Frijns, Lucas Luhr, Richie Stanaway, Alex Lynn, Sam Bird and Alex Gurney at Jerez in December 2014. Blomqvist joined the RBM Team alongside Augusto Farfus and finished the season in a respectable 14th place, having made DTM history as the youngest BMW driver to win a race in his first season, at Oschersleben, and the second youngest race winner with any manufacturer.

2016 
For the 2016 season Blomqvist remained with the RBM Team but with a new teammate, Maxime Martin. He concluded a successful 2016 DTM season in point-scoring fashion at the series’ finale in Hockenheim, ending the season in sixth position in the Drivers' Championship, the youngest driver in the top ten of the season's final standings.

2017 
2017 saw Blomqvist remain with BMW and Team RBM, but in the newly formed Team RBR, with ex Formula One driver Timo Glock as his stablemate.

Formula E

2017-18 season 
He participated in the 2017–18 Formula E season with the MS&AD Andretti Formula E team. This caused some confusion as he was confirmed by the official FIA entry list, rather than an announcement by the team. He made his debut at Marrakesh ePrix, replacing Kamui Kobayashi. His teammate was António Félix da Costa, who had raced in Formula E since the inaugural 2014–15 season (with Team Aguri for 2014–15). Despite a strong debut in Marrakesh, finishing in 8th position, his results were not considered good enough by the team & he was replaced with Stéphane Sarrazin for the final four races of the season. Blomqvist returned to the Formula E paddock for the 2019 Berlin ePrix, where he acted as a TV pundit, in place of the regular Dario Franchitti, who was attending the 2019 Indy 500.

2019-20 season 
Blomqvist returned to the race seat for the final two races of the 2019–20 season-ending 2020 Berlin ePrix, replacing Jaguar's James Calado, who had other commitments.

2020-21 season 
Blomqvist was then given a full-time seat at the NIO 333 FE Team for the 2020–21 Formula E World Championship, driving alongside fellow Briton Oliver Turvey. The car was one of the slowest on the grid, finishing in last place of the constructors, with Blomqvist accumulating 6 points, and Turvey 13.

For the 2021–22 season, Blomqvist opted to leave NIO and joined Envision Racing as a reserve driver.

FIA World Endurance Championship

2018 
In the 2018 Blancpain GT Series Endurance Cup, driving a BMW M6 GT3 for Team Walkenhorst Motorsport, Blomqvist, and teammates Philipp Eng and Christian Krognes won the 2018 24 Hours of Spa.

2021 
During the 2021 FIA World Endurance Championship, Blomqvist, ex-teammate at Carlin in F3 Sean Gelael, and ex-Formula 1 driver Stoffel Vandoorne were driving an Oreca 07 for Jota Sport team, in the Le Mans Prototype2 class. They finished second in the class, collecting four podiums out of the five races, including a second place in the famous 24 Hours of Le Mans.

2023 
Blomqvist will return to the 2023 FIA World Endurance Championship with United Autosports in the LMP2 category alongside Oliver Jarvis and Josh Pierson. He served as the replacement for Alex Lynn, who moved to the Hypercar class with Chip Ganassi Racing. Blomqvist stated that a large part of his decision to take the drive was the presence of Jarvis, with whom he won the DPi class title in the IMSA SportsCar Championship the previous year.

IMSA

2019 
Blomqvist made his debut in the 2018 IMSA SportsCar Championship at the wheel of a BMW M8 GTE, at Watkins Glen International, in a one-off race appearance, and finished in a respectable 8th in the GT Le Mans category. In 2019, he stuck around for a full season, driving the BMW of M8 GTE of Rahal Letterman Lanigan Racing once again. He scored solid points all throughout the season, with his best finish coming in the season's finale at the 2019 Petit Le Mans, a third place podium. He ended the year 9th in the GT Le Mans category, with 258 points.

2022 
Following his Formula E campaign, Blomqvist was announced in November 2021, as one of the driver's for Meyer Shank Racing in the 2022 IMSA SportsCar Championship, driving the Acura ARX-05 along with teammate Oliver Jarvis. He started the season with a win at the Rolex 24 and won again that season at Road Atlanta. This would secure him and Jarvis the title that season

2023 
For 2023, Blomqvist was retained by Meyer Shank Racing, this time driving the brand new Acura ARX-06 in the revived GTP class, being partnered by Colin Braun. Blomqvist and Meyer Shank started the season in the same way as 2022, winning the Rolex 24.

IndyCar

2022 
Following his successful season in IMSA for Meyer Shank Racing, he tested one of the team's cars in October 2022 in a private IndyCar driver evaluation test at Sebring. He was fastest out of the 5 participants.

Racing record

Career summary 

† As Blomqvist was a guest driver, he was ineligible to score points.
* Season still in progress.

Complete Formula 3 Euro Series results 
(key)

Complete FIA Formula 3 European Championship results 
(key)

Complete Deutsche Tourenwagen Masters results 
(key) (Races in bold indicate pole position) (Races in italics indicate fastest lap)

† Driver retired, but was classified as they completed 75% of the winner's race distance.

Complete FIA World Endurance Championship results 

* Season still in progress.

Complete Blancpain GT Series Sprint Cup results

Complete Formula E results 
(key) (Races in bold indicate pole position; races in italics indicate fastest lap)

Complete IMSA SportsCar Championship results 
(key) (Races in bold indicate pole position; races in italics indicate fastest lap)

* Season still in progress.

Complete 24 Hours of Le Mans results

References

External links 
 
 

 

1993 births
Living people
Sportspeople from Cambridge
English people of Swedish descent
English people of New Zealand descent
English racing drivers
Sweden Formula Renault 2.0 drivers
Formula Renault 2.0 NEZ drivers
British Formula Renault 2.0 drivers
German Formula Three Championship drivers
Formula 3 Euro Series drivers
British Formula Three Championship drivers
FIA Formula 3 European Championship drivers
Deutsche Tourenwagen Masters drivers
Formula E drivers
FIA World Endurance Championship drivers
24 Hours of Le Mans drivers
Fortec Motorsport drivers
Performance Racing drivers
EuroInternational drivers
Ma-con Motorsport drivers
Carlin racing drivers
BMW M drivers
Racing Bart Mampaey drivers
Rowe Racing drivers
Andretti Autosport drivers
Rahal Letterman Lanigan Racing drivers
Jaguar Racing drivers
NIO 333 FE Team drivers
Jota Sport drivers
WeatherTech SportsCar Championship drivers
Blancpain Endurance Series drivers
Asian Le Mans Series drivers
AF Corse drivers
Meyer Shank Racing drivers
Formula BMW Pacific drivers
Finland Formula Renault 2.0 drivers
Extreme Speed Motorsports drivers
Schnitzer Motorsport drivers
Nürburgring 24 Hours drivers
Cupra Racing drivers
United Autosports drivers